Logan Township is one of twelve townships in Allen County, Kansas, United States. As of the 2010 census, its population was 219.

Geography

According to the USGS, it contains two cemeteries: Dewitt and Ellison.

The streams of Bloody Run, Mud Creek, Onion Creek, Owl Creek and Scatter Creek run through this township.

References
 USGS Geographic Names Information System (GNIS)

External links
 City-Data.com

Townships in Allen County, Kansas
Townships in Kansas